Nicole Boudreau may refer to:

 Nicole Boudreau (Quebec administrator) (born 1949), administrator, activist, and politician in Montreal, Quebec, Canada
 Nicole Boudreau (Montreal politician), former politician in Montreal, Quebec, Canada
 Nicole Boudreau, vocalist with The Royalty, an American indie rock band